Broadrock is a cliff on the coast in Dorset, southern England. It faces out into Weymouth Bay between Bowleaze Cove and Redcliff Point. There are many landslips on the cliffs at this point.

See also 
 Corallian Limestone

References 

Cliffs of England
Landforms of Dorset
Geology of Dorset
Jurassic Coast